Christian Sole (13 November 1896 – 1 April 1980) was a Norwegian politician for the Conservative Party.

He served as a deputy representative to the Parliament of Norway from Rogaland during the term 1945–1949. In total he met during fourteen days of parliamentary session.

References

1896 births
1980 deaths
Conservative Party (Norway) politicians
Deputy members of the Storting
Rogaland politicians